The ABC Under-18 Championship 1995 is the 13th edition of the ABC's junior championship for basketball. The games were held at Manila, Philippines from March 3–11, 1995.

Preliminary round

Group A

Group B

Group C

Group D

Quarterfinal round

Group I

Group II

Group III

Group IV

Classification 13th–15th

Semifinals

14th place

Classification 9th–12th

Semifinals

11th place

9th place

Classification 5th–8th

Semifinals

7th place

5th place

Final round

Semifinals

3rd place

Final

Final standing

Awards

Mythical Five
 Wang Zhizhi
 Zhu Dong
 Zaid Al-Khas
 Cho Woo-hyun
 Joseph Gumatay

References

External links
 FIBA Archive

FIBA Asia Under-18 Championship
1995–96 in Asian basketball
1995 in Philippine basketball
International basketball competitions hosted by the Philippines
March 1995 sports events in Asia